Júlio Gourinho (born 29 April 1923, died before 2008) was a Portuguese sailor. He competed at the 1948 Summer Olympics, the 1952 Summer Olympics and the 1960 Summer Olympics.

References

External links
 

1923 births
Year of death missing
Portuguese male sailors (sport)
Olympic sailors of Portugal
Sailors at the 1948 Summer Olympics – Star
Sailors at the 1952 Summer Olympics – 5.5 Metre
Sailors at the 1960 Summer Olympics – 5.5 Metre
Sportspeople from Lisbon